"Without the right of correspondence" (WRC) (abbreviated as БПП in official documents) was a clause in a sentence of many political repressions victims of Stalinist Great Purges in Soviet Union that implied death. It was used to keep family relatives of those executed uncertain as to the fate or whereabouts of the victims.

Meaning
WRC was used as a euphemism to cover the true nature of a court sentence.

In many cases during the late 1930s 'Great Purge' campaign of political repression, the sentence handed down was "10 years of corrective labor camps without the right of correspondence", which was announced to relatives, while the paperwork contained the real sentence: "the highest degree of punishment: execution by shooting". Many people did not understand the official euphemism and incorrectly believed that their relative was still alive in prison.

As Alexander Solzhenitsyn put it in The Gulag Archipelago:

 

For example, all of the bodies identified from the mass graves at Vinnytsia and Kuropaty had received a WRC sentence.

Notable victims
Mikhail Koltsov (a Soviet writer and correspondent, a prototype of Karkov in Hemingway's For Whom the Bell Tolls), executed February 2, 1940. When his brother, Boris Efimov, by a miracle got an appointment with Vasiliy Ulrikh, the latter told him that Koltsov was sentenced to 10 years WRC.
Matvei Petrovich Bronstein (executed in 1937), a theoretical physicist and a pioneer of quantum gravity.
Volodymyr Zatonsky (executed 29 July 1938) a Ukrainian Soviet leader

See also
Nacht und Nebel
By administrative means

References

External links
 , a 1990 Russian film ("Ten Years without the Right of Correspondence")

Euphemisms
Political repression in the Soviet Union
Soviet law
Soviet cover-ups
Capital punishment
Soviet phraseology